Cuói, known as Thổ, is a dialect cluster spoken by around 70,000 Thổ people in Vietnam and a couple thousand in Laos, mainly in the provinces of Bolikhamsai and Khammouane.

Phonology

Làng Lỡ dialect

Consonants
The consonant inventory of the Làng Lỡ dialect, as cited by Michel Ferlus:
{| class=wikitable style=text-align:center
|+ Initial consonants of Cuối Làng Lỡ
|-
! colspan=2|
! Bilabial
! Labiodental
! Alveolar
! Retroflex
! Palatal
! Velar
! Glottal
|-
! colspan=2| Nasal
| 
|
| 
|
| 
| 
|
|-
! rowspan=3| Plosive
! tenuis
| 
|
| 
| 
| 
| 
| 
|-
! glottalized
| 
|
| 
|
| 
|
|
|-
! aspirated
|
|
| 
|
|
| 
|
|-
! rowspan=3| Fricative
! voiceless
| 
|
| 
| 
|
|
| 
|-
! voiced
| 
| 
| 
|
|
| 
|
|-
! glottalized
|
|
| 
|
|
|
|
|-
! colspan=2| Approximant
|
|
| 
|  ~ 
| 
|
|
|}

  is found in Vietnamese loanwords with initial  (orthographic )
  originate in the borrowing of segments from a variety of Vietnamese that existed several centuries ago.

Vowels
{| class="wikitable" style="text-align: center;"
|+ Monothongs of Cuối Làng Lỡ
|-
!
! Front
! Central
! Back
|-
! Close
| 
| 
| 
|-
! Close-mid/Mid
| 
|  
| 
|-
! Open-mid/Open
| 
|    
| 
|}

Tones
There're eight tones in the Làng Lỡ. Tones 1 to 6 are found on sonorant-final syllables (a.k.a. 'live' syllables): syllables ending in a vowel, semi-vowel or nasal. Tones 7 and 8 are found on obstruent-final syllables (a.k.a. 'stopped' syllables), ending in -p -t -c -k. This is a system comparable to that of Vietnamese.

Vocabulary

The data is from Cuoi Cham vocabulary recordings and the Mon-Khmer Etymological Dictionary.

References

Further reading

Nguyen, Huu Hoanh and Nguyen Van Loi (2019). Tones in the Cuoi Language of Tan Ki District in Nghe An Province, Vietnam. The Journal of the Southeast Asian Linguistics Society 12.1:lvii-lxvi.

Languages of Laos
Languages of Vietnam
Vietic languages